The Brooklyn Union Gas Company Headquarters, also known as 180 Remsen Street, and since 1962 the St. Francis College Arts Building, is a historic building in Brooklyn Heights, Brooklyn, New York City. Designed by Brooklyn architect Frank Freeman and completed in 1914, it was designated a New York City landmark in 2011.

History

The Brooklyn Union Gas Company was originally established in 1825 as the Brooklyn Gas Light Company, changing its name after a series of mergers in 1895. Rapid growth in the early 1900s prompted the company to establish a new headquarters at 180 Remsen Street. Noted Brooklyn architect Frank Freeman was commissioned to design the new headquarters, which was built in 1914.

The Gas Company continued to occupy the building for the next 47 years. In 1962, it was sold and became the St. Francis College Arts Building. In May 2009, the Landmarks Preservation Committee voted in support of designating the building a New York landmark. It was approved on May 10, 2011.

Description

Although architect Frank Freeman is best known for his work in the Richardsonian Romanesque style, the Brooklyn Union Gas Company Building was completed during his later, Neoclassical period, and is more restrained than his earlier work. The eight-story building is divided into three sections. 

The ground floor, constructed of granite, consists of a large central entranceway flanked by a pair of large windows on either side. Above the entrance is a shallow portico supported on two Roman Doric columns, above which is a heavy, decorated cornice running the width of the building. The next four floors are of a very simple design, consisting of four rows of unadorned rectangular windows surmounted by a plain cornice. The final two floors consist of two more rows of windows, spaced by a series of six Ionic columns rising to an entablature and, at the top of the building, a heavy stone cornice. The structure as a whole has been characterized as "a fine, stately office building demonstrating Freeman's infinite versatility."

The AIA Guide to New York City says of the building that it is one of Freeman's "lesser work[s]".

References
Notes

Bibliography
 Morrone, Francis; Iska, James (2001): An Architectural Guidebook to Brooklyn, Gibbs Smith, .
 Architecture and Building - A Magazine Devoted To Contemporary Architectural Construction - Volume 46, originally published in 1914, reprinted in 2009 by Dick Press, .

External links
 

Frank Freeman buildings
Buildings and structures completed in 1914
St. Francis College
New York City Designated Landmarks in Brooklyn
Buildings and structures in Brooklyn
1914 establishments in New York City
Brooklyn Heights